Lake Chaffee is a census-designated place (CDP) in the northwest part of the town of Ashford, Windham County, Connecticut, United States. It is a residential community surrounding Lake Chaffee, a small water body formed in the early 20th century by damming an area of wetlands. Connecticut Route 89 (Ference Road) forms the eastern edge of the CDP, leading north  to Interstate 84 and south  to U.S. Route 44 at Warrenville.

Lake Chaffee was first listed as a CDP prior to the 2020 census.

References 

Census-designated places in Windham County, Connecticut
Census-designated places in Connecticut